The Tupuangi Formation is a geological formation in New Zealand, only exposed on Pitt Island in the Chatham Islands. It is the oldest exposed sedimentary unit within the archipelago. It was deposited in terrestrial deltaic to paralic conditions during the Cenomanian to Turonian ages of the Late Cretaceous. During this time period the Chatham Islands were attached to Antarctica within the Antarctic Circle, at approximately 70° to 80° south.

Description 
The lithology consists of a basal conglomerate, which grades into sandstone and carbonaceous siltstone in the upper part of the formation. The formation is notable for its fossil content, including many varieties of plant, including abundant conifers, including members of Araucariaceae, Podocarpaceae, Cupressaceae, Cheirolepidiaceae, as well as Ginkgo and Ginkgoites. Other flora includes mosses, ferns, liverworts and lycopodians. Compression fossils of insects have been found including members of Carabidae and Buprestidae, and acritarch Introvertocystis. Amber is also known from the deposit associated with the conifer Protodammara reimatamoriori, a member of Cupressaceae.

See also 
 Stratigraphy of New Zealand
 South Polar region of the Cretaceous

References 

Geologic formations of New Zealand
Cretaceous System of Oceania
Cenomanian Stage
Turonian Stage
Sandstone formations
Siltstone formations
Deltaic deposits
Fluvial deposits
Fossiliferous stratigraphic units of Oceania
Paleontology in New Zealand
Geography of the Chatham Islands